DCIM may refer to:

 DCIM (directory) (digital camera images), a directory name for digital cameras
 Data center infrastructure management, the union of information technology and data center facility management disciplines